Scytodes kumonga is a species of spider in the Scytodidae family native to Iran. It was described in 2020. The specific name kumonga refers to the spider kaiju Kumonga, a recurring monster in the Godzilla franchise by Toho which can spit silk in a similar manner to spitting spiders to ensnare opponents, whose name in turn is derived from the Japanese word for 'spider', . Kumonga's binomial name in Godzilla Singular Point, Kumonga scytodes, pays homage to this species.

See also
 Agroeca angirasu, a species of sac spider named after the Kaiju Anguirus also native to Iran, classified in 2021

References

Scytodidae
Spiders described in 2020
Endemic fauna of Iran